Huyeh or Huyah or Havyeh or Huyyeh may refer to:
 Huyyeh, Isfahan
 Huyeh, Kurdistan